In the Roman period there was an important settlement (vicus) on the territory of the present-day village of Elewijt (part of Zemst, Flemish Brabant, Belgium). It was located at the junction of a secondary road (deverticulum) with the major Roman road between Tongeren and Boulogne. In the early first century, a temporary military camp was built and not much later a village started to develop. At the end of the second century, the village was ravaged by Germanic tribes, after which it was slowly rebuilt with a completely different ground plan. The vicus continued to exist as a village until the late third century, but did not recover from a second heavy attack at the end of this period. The present-day village of Elewijt developed half a mile south of the center of the vicus and cannot be seen as its successor.

Location 
Elewijt was located on the major Roman road connecting the eastern city of Tongeren with the western city of Boulogne. Nearby vici were those of Tienen, Asse and Rumst.

References 
 

Roman sites in Belgium
History of Flanders
Gallia Belgica